Mauidrillia occidentalis is an extinct species of sea snail, a marine gastropod mollusk in the family Horaiclavidae.

Description

Distribution
This extinct marine species is endemic to New Zealand

References

 Maxwell, P.A. 1988, Late Miocene deep-water Mollusca from the Stillwater Mudstone at Greymouth, Westland, New Zealand : paleoecology and systematics. Lower Hutt: New Zealand Geological Survey. New Zealand Geological Survey paleontological bulletin 55. 120 p.
 Maxwell, P.A. (2009). Cenozoic Mollusca. pp. 232–254 in Gordon, D.P. (ed.) New Zealand inventory of biodiversity. Volume one. Kingdom Animalia: Radiata, Lophotrochozoa, Deuterostomia. Canterbury University Press, Christchurch

External links
 National Paleontological Collection Database: Mauidrillia occidentalis

occidentalis
Gastropods described in 1988